Calliostoma scobinatum is a species of sea snail, a marine gastropod mollusk in the family Calliostomatidae.

Some authors place this taxon in the subgenus Calliostoma (Fautor).

Description
The height of the shell varies between 6 mm and 12.5 mm.

Distribution
This marine species occurs off India and the Philippines.

References

  Reeve, L.A. 1863. Monograph of the genus Zizyphinus. pls 2-8 in Reeve, L.A. (ed). Conchologia Iconica. London : L. Reeve & Co. Vol. 14.
 Marshall, B.A. 1995. Calliostomatidae (Gastropoda: Trochoidea) from New Caledonia, the Loyalty Islands, and the northern Lord Howe Rise. pp. 381-458 in Bouchet, P. (ed.). Résultats des Campagnes MUSORSTOM, 14. Mémoires du Muséum national d'Histoire naturelle, Paris [1936-1950] 167: 1-654 
 Subba Rao, N.V. 2003. Indian Seashells (Part 1). Records of the Zoological Survey of India, Occasional Paper (192): 1-416
 Poppe, G.T., Tagaro, S.P. & Dekker, H. 2006. The Seguenziidae, Chilodontidae, Trochidae, Calliostomatidae and Solariellidae of the Philippine Islands. Visaya, Supplement 2: 1-228

External links
 
 Jansen, P. 2000. A preliminary checklist of the recent Australian Trochidae

scobinatum
Gastropods described in 1863